Nicolae D. Popescu (August 9, 1843–June 8, 1921) was a Romanian prose writer.

He was born in Bucharest to Romanian Orthodox priest Dimitrie Popescu and his wife Niculina. Popescu began high school in his native city, but left early in 1861 in order to become a civil servant at the Foreign Ministry, where he worked until retiring in 1913. He wrote numerous calendars starting in 1866, and also published work in Amicul familiei, Columna lui Traian, Ghimpele, Revista contimporană, Revista literară și științifică, România ilustrată, Telegraful and Vatra. He wrote sensationalist novels, either historically themed or inspired by ballads and traditions surrounding famous hajduks and bandits. A few of his many novels include Radu al III-lea cel Frumos, 1864; Amazoana de la Rahova, 1879; Iancu Jianu, 1880; Miul haiducul, 1881; Tunsul haiducul, 1881; Codreanu haiducu, 1882 and Boierii haiduci, 1892. As shown by their repeated republication, these were much loved by the late 19th century reading public. He also published a series of song and couplet collections, in the style of Anton Pann's old anthologies.

Notes

1843 births
1921 deaths
Writers from Bucharest
Romanian historical novelists
Romanian civil servants
Almanac compilers